"星愿 (I Will)" is the debut studio album by Chinese singer Zhang Liyin, better known among English-speakers as simply "I WILL". It was released in various regions of China on March 3, 2008, and released in South Korea on March 12, 2008, which included two bonus Korean tracks. The Asian Special Edition (CD+DVD) of the album was released on March 28, 2008 in Taiwan. Two music videos of the same storyline were released on February 27, 2008 to complement the album release.

Overview
After a two-year hiatus since Zhang's debut single, "Timeless" in 2006, S.M. Entertainment released a Chinese album for Zhang rather than a Korean album, even though her first single was released in Korean. Originally thought to be released in 2007, SM Entertainment pushed back the production of the album because of Zhang's studies. In January 2008, Zhang announced that the expected release for her new album is in February, but due to album packaging conflicts, the album release was again pushed to an early March 2008 release date. An album showcase was held on February 27, 2008 in Beijing.

Following her first two singles of the album, "Timeless" and "Y (Why...)", most of the songs on the album were ballads. The album contained three duets: The Chinese version of her first single, "Timeless", featuring Xiah of TVXQ; "交错的爱", featuring Jonghyun, her company junior before he was included in SHINee; and "纯真的爱", a R&B ballad featuring Song Bingyang, her childhood friend.

Besides ballads, the album also contained three upbeat songs. "A Flame For You" is the theme song for CCTV's drama Ding Jia You Nu Xi Yang Yang which happens to star Zhang's company senior, Kangta. Composed by well-known SM Entertainment composer, Yoo Young Jin, and with lyrics co-written by Zhang Li Yin, "One More Try" is a R&B dance song dedicated to the 2008 Beijing Olympics. "後" is a song with hard beats that most closely depicts Zhang Li Yin's preferred R&B style.

Chart performance
I Will received notable success in China. In mid-July, it was reported that it had sold over 268,000 in the first half of 2008. In Korea, the album debuted with moderate success at #22 on Korea's MIAK Monthly Album Chart of March, selling over 2,000 copies in Korea that month, despite a lack of promotion. The album's first single, "I Will" debuted as #16 on Guangzhou Music Charts and moved up ten spots to #6 after two weeks of release. The second single, "The Left Shore of Happiness" moved up ten spots to #7. The same single peaked at #1 on Korea's Melon Music Chart for two full weeks.

However, the single did not receive national success until one month after its original release. During the second week of April 2008, "I Will" peaked at #1 on China's Largest Online Music Ranking (中國某大型網站音樂排行榜) - a ranking that considers weekly chart statistics from Guangdong Radio, Shandong Radio, Hunan Radio and 30 other domestic radio rankings, along with Internet voting and album sales. After Zhang's performance of "I Will" at the Mengniu Music Chart Awards, the song went up seven places. While in Taiwan, the record received equally good results; peaking in a mid-top 10 position on Five Music and G-Music rankings.

Music videos
Zhang released two music videos with a single storyline. The music videos feature the same cast from Zhang's "Timeless" music video, Super Junior members Han Geng and Siwon, and Lee Yeonhee. The first music video, "I Will", introduces the story of three childhood friends that are trained together in Beijing opera. The music video of "I Will" ends with a cliff hanger, which the story continues and ends in the second music video, "幸福的左岸." The Asia Special Edition of the album also contained two "Timeless" music videos from her first single, but instead of the single's Korean version in the video, Zhang and Xiah Junsu are heard singing its Chinese version.

Track listing

Chinese Version

Korean Version

Asian Special Version

Charts

Mainland China

Taiwan

Release history

References

External links
 Zhang Li Yin's Official Website  

2008 debut albums
SM Entertainment albums